The Acting Witan of Mercia is a political concept based in the Midlands of England. It is the belief that the United Kingdom is in illegal occupation of the ancient English region of Mercia, as a result of the Norman Conquest and the perceived Norman Yoke, and the Acting Witan claims to be its de jure and acting government.

Origins

The Mercia Movement was formed in 1993 to produce the blueprint for the Draft Constitution for Mercia, along with a work entitled 'The Mercia Manifesto: A blueprint for the future inspired by the past'. The Mercian Constitutional Convention was formed in Birmingham on 17 March 2001 and decided to accept the Draft Constitution for Mercia as the basis for its deliberations.<ref>Derby Evening Telegraph, 23. 2. 2001.</ref>Enfield Advertiser, 14. 3. 2001, page 6.East London Advertiser, page 18, 22. 5. 2003.Central News, Central TV, 29. 5. 2003.The Constitution Of Mercia, The Mercian Constitutional Convention, page 3, Witan Books, 2003. The Convention debated the draft for over two years and passed a series of amendments to it, although the essence of the draft remained the same and most of its content was unaltered. The Convention published the final draft of its work as The Constitution Of Mercia, a 21-page booklet, in 2003. It consisted of 28 Articles and numerous sub-articles and claimed to be 'the ultimate legal authority in Mercia', stated in Article 1.1 to 'comprise its historic twenty shires ([1] Bedfordshire, [2] Buckinghamshire, [3] Cambridgeshire, [4] Cheshire, [5] Derbyshire, [6] Gloucestershire, [7] Herefordshire, [8] Hertfordshire, [9] Huntingdonshire, [10] Leicestershire, [11] Lincolnshire, [12] Middlesex, [13] Northamptonshire, [14] Nottinghamshire, [15] Oxfordshire, [16] Rutland, [17] Shropshire, [18] Staffordshire, [19] Warwickshire and [20] Worcestershire) or such of these as find a common Mercian identity and wish to be included in the region'.Sunday Mercury, 14. 10. 2007, pages 12-13.Sunday Mercury, 21. 10. 2007, page 41. The Constitution offered a new holistic society in Mercia, based on organic democracy, co-operative community and ecological balance.

Formation and campaigns

On 29 May 2003, Jeff Kent, Joyce Millington, and David Bastable issued the "Declaration of Mercian Independence", in Victoria Square, Birmingham, in the heart of the region.Buckinghamshire Herald, 28. 5. 2003.Midlands Today, BBC TV, 29. 5. 2003.The Acting Witan of Mercia minutes and www.independentmercia.org/news. After the declaration, the Convention renamed itself the Acting Witan of Mercia, which aimed to spearhead the full democratisation of the region and the re-establishment of its de facto independence.Northampton Herald & Post, 25. 5. 2006, page 14.The Big Issue, 11-17. 3. 2013, No. 980, pages 1 and 20-21.The Constitution Of Mercia, back cover blurb, The Mercian Constitutional Convention, Witan Books, 2003.
On 29 May 2004, the first Mercian Independence Day anniversary, members of the Acting Witan launched a new currency for the region, the Mercian penny, in Victoria Square, Birmingham, and handed out the coins free to people who registered as citizens of Mercia.Widowinde, No. 134, Summer 2004, pages 38-39. By May 2009, over 2,000 people had registered as Mercian citizens.The Acting Witan of Mercia minutes.
On 26 February 2010, outside the Potteries Museum & Art Gallery, in Stoke-on-Trent, the purported "convener of the Acting Witan" (Jeff Kent) and the purported "Acting Sheriff of Staffordshire" (Philip Snow) made a declaration claiming the Staffordshire Hoard to be the property of the citizens of Mercia.The Sentinel, 27. 2. 2010, page 2.

See also

Regionalism (politics)
Secession

References

Further readingThe English Rebel: One thousand Years of Troublemaking from the Normans to the Nineties, David Horspool, Penguin Books, 2010.A Radical Reader: The struggle for change in England, 1381-1914, Christopher Hampton (editor), Penguin Books Ltd, 1984.Liberty Against The Law, Essay 5, Robin Hood, and Essay 6, Robin Hood, Possessive Individualism and the Norman Yoke, Christopher Hill, The Penguin Press, 1996.The English Resistance: The Underground War Against the Normans, Peter Rex, Tempus Publishing Ltd, 2004.Bondmen Made Free: Medieval Peasant Movements and the English Rising of 1381, Rodney Hilton, Routledge, 1995.Puritanism & Revolution, Essay 3, The Norman Yoke, Christopher Hill, Secker & Warburg, 1958.The Mercia Manifesto: A blueprint for the future inspired by the past, The Mercia Movement, Witan Books, 1997.A Draft Constitution For Mercia, The Mercia Movement, Witan Books, 2001.The Constitution Of Mercia'', The Mercian Constitutional Convention, Witan Books, 2003.

External links
http://www.independentmercia.org

Advocacy groups in the United Kingdom
Devolution in the United Kingdom
Mercia
Separatism in the United Kingdom
Secessionist organizations in Europe
2001 establishments in England